
Gmina Krzywda is a rural gmina (administrative district) in Łuków County, Lublin Voivodeship, in eastern Poland.

Villages
Gmina Krzywda contains the villages and settlements of Budki, Cisownik, Drożdżak, Feliksin, Fiukówka, Gołe Łazy, Huta Radoryska, Huta-Dąbrowa, Kasyldów, Kożuchówka, Krzywda, Laski, Nowy Patok, Okrzeja, Podosie, Radoryż Kościelny, Radoryż Smolany, Ruda, Stary Patok, Szczałb, Teodorów, Wielgolas, Wola Okrzejska and Zimna Woda.

Neighbouring gminas
Gmina Krzywda is bordered by the gminas of Adamów, Kłoczew, Nowodwór, Stanin, Wojcieszków and Wola Mysłowska.

References
Polish official population figures 2006

Krzywda
Łuków County